Coryda is a genus of gastropods belonging to the family Cepolidae. 

The species of this genus are found in Central America.

Species:

Coryda alauda 
 Coryda beatensis (Bartsch, 1932)
Coryda caraballoi 
 Coryda circumornata (Férussac, 1821)
 Coryda devexa (Pilsbry, 1933)
Coryda dominicana 
Coryda edentula 
Coryda hebe 
Coryda lindoni 
 † Coryda miocenica (Pilsbry & Olsson, 1954) 
 Coryda monodonta (I. Lea, 1834)
Coryda montana 
 † Coryda propappa (Pilsbry & Olsson, 1954) 
Coryda samana 
Coryda thierryi

References

 Bank, R. A. (2017). Classification of the Recent terrestrial Gastropoda of the World. Last update: July 16th, 2017.

External links
 Albers, J. C. (1850). Die Heliceen nach natürlicher Verwandtschaft systematisch geordnet. Berlin: Enslin. 262 pp.

Cepolidae (gastropods)
Gastropod genera